Shadow Racing Cars was a Formula One and sports car racing team, founded and initially based in the United States although later Formula One operations were run from the British base in Northampton. Their only F1 victory, at the 1977 Austrian Grand Prix, was achieved as a British team.

The Shadow name was revived by Bernardo Manfrè in 2020 as an Italian car tuning and luxury brand. The revived Shadow brand currently competes in NASCAR Whelen Euro Series as the MK1 Racing Italia team, currently fielding the No. 16 Shadow DNM8 for Claudio Remigio Cappelli and Alfredo de Matteo  and the No. 17 Shadow DNM8 for Manfrè and Francesco Garisto with technical partnership from Race Art Technology.

History

1968–1972: Early years in CanAm series
The company was founded by Don Nichols in California in 1968 as "Advanced Vehicle Systems"; the cars were called Shadows, designed by Trevor Harris and entered under the Shadow Racing Inc. banner. The first Shadows, the Mk.Is, were entered in the CanAm series with George Follmer and Vic Elford driving them. The Mk.1 featured an innovative design, using very small wheels for low drag and, although the car was quick, it was not the most reliable car in the field

The team became more competitive the following year, replacing the Harris car with a Peter Bryant design owing some elements to his Ti22 "titanium car" with Jackie Oliver also arriving from this effort and finishing eighth in the CanAm championship. The team also found some financial backing from Universal Oil Products (UOP).

Shadow came to dominate the shortened 1974 series, although by this point they were competing largely against privateers, the works McLaren and Porsche efforts having left the series.

1973–1974: Entry into Formula One

Towards the end of 1972, Nichols announced that he would enter his team into Formula One in the 1973 season with UOP sponsored cars designed by Tony Southgate, who had designed the BRM that gave Jean-Pierre Beltoise victory at the Monaco Grand Prix the previous year.

The team debuted in Formula One at the 1973 South African Grand Prix with the Shadow DN1 chassis. Two cars were available for drivers Oliver and Follmer, as well as one car for the privateer team Embassy Hill of Graham Hill who ran his team alongside the Shadow works team.

For the 1974 season, the team hired two of the most promising drivers of the time: American Peter Revson and Frenchman Jean-Pierre Jarier. During a practice run for the 1974 South African Grand Prix, Revson was killed by a suspension failure on his DN3 car. He was replaced by Tom Pryce.

1975–1977: Peak of success

The new DN5 driven by Jarier gained pole position in the two first Grands Prix of the 1975 season but suffered mechanical failure in both races. The DN5 and most other Shadow Formula One cars used Ford Cosworth DFV engines, which produced around 490 bhp. However, later in 1975, another car was driven by Jarier, the DN7, and was fitted with a Matra V12 engine producing around 550 bhp. The wheelbase was substantially lengthened to accommodate the much larger and more expensive French powerplant, although due to budgetary issues, the Matra-powered DN7 was doomed as a one-off. Jarier's new teammate, Pryce, won the non-championship Race of Champions that same year. Pryce died in an accident involving a marshal at the 1977 South African Grand Prix.  The marshal, Frederick Jansen Van Vuuren, had been running across the track to put out a small fire on the other Shadow car and Pryce was unable to avoid the collision because he was un-sighted behind the March of Hans-Joachim Stuck. Pryce struck Van Vuuren at speed and was hit on the head and killed by the fire extinguisher Van Vuuren was carrying. Before Pryce's car finally came to a stop it hit Jacques Laffite's Ligier resulting in both cars crashing into the barriers. Van Vuuren's injuries were so severe that he could initially only be identified by his absence from a marshal's meeting after the accident.

The team replaced Pryce with Alan Jones, who won the team's only Grand Prix at the Austrian Grand Prix the same year.

1978–1980: Decline
After the 1977 season Shadow entered into a sharp decline. Jones left to join Williams for 1978. In the same period a majority of their staff and their sponsor Franco Ambrosio left to form their team, Arrows, taking the young Riccardo Patrese. Despite sponsorship from Villiger tobacco and the signing of experienced drivers Clay Regazzoni and Hans Stuck for the 1978 season, results were poor. In 1980 they were absorbed into Theodore Racing, but Shadow's first ground effect chassis was largely uncompetitive, only once qualifying a car in seven races. Sponsorship dried up and after the seventh of the year's 14 races Teddy Yip wound up the Shadow team.

2020– : Revival and NASCAR participation
In 2020, 40 years after Shadow last raced in Formula One, it was announced that the Shadow Racing Cars name will be revived by Italian entrepreneur and racing driver Bernardo Manfrè as an Italian car tuning and luxury brand. Plans have been announced by the revived Shadow to develop a hypercar called Hypercar Shadow and a modified variant of the Dodge Challenger known as the Dodge Challenger Shadow DNB8 (later renamed as the Shadow DNM8). Shadow Racing Cars also entered the NASCAR Whelen Euro Series in 2020 under the banner of Swiss-based team 42 Racing, fielding owner Manfrè in the team's No. 17 Ford Mustang along with Luigi Ferrara and Francesco Garisto in the No. 42 Ford Mustang. While the team was initially scheduled to enter the full-season, the team missed the second half of the season after members of the Shadow team was tested positive for COVID-19 prior to both NASCAR GP Croatia at Rijeka and Valencian Super Speedweek at Valencia. 

The team would make its return in 2021 with a Shadow DNM8-based chassis, the first racing chassis to be entered under the Shadow Racing Cars name since the Shadow DN12 was last raced in the 1980 French Grand Prix. The team's EuroNASCAR 2 driver Francesco Garisto finished fifth with the #42 Shadow DNM8 that year after scoring two podium finishes at Most and Vallelunga. Shadow and 42 Racing parted ways at the conclusion of the 2021 season and the team would began to compete under the MK1 Racing Italia banner starting from the 2022 season and moved the team's base from Lugano to Bollate in Italy. Shadow would retain Manfrè and Garisto, now competing with the #17 team, as they signed Claudio Remigio Cappelli and Alfredo de Matteo to compete with the #16 team, which was rebranded from the #42 team. Shadow would also receive technical support from fellow competitor Race Art Technology to help field the two Shadow DNM8's in 2022.

Complete Formula One results

Works team entries
(key)

Notes
† – The driver did not finish the Grand Prix, but was classified, as he completed over 90% of the race distance.
‡ – Half points awarded as less than 75% of the race distance was completed.

Results of other Shadow cars
(key)

References

American auto racing teams
American racecar constructors
British auto racing teams
British racecar constructors
Formula One constructors
Formula One entrants
World Sportscar Championship teams
Can-Am entrants
NASCAR teams
Vehicle manufacturing companies established in 1968
Vehicle manufacturing companies disestablished in 1980
1968 establishments in California
1980 disestablishments in England
2020 establishments in Italy
Auto racing teams established in 2020